This is a list of films which have placed number one at the weekend box office in the United Kingdom during 2012.

Films

References

2012
United Kingdom
2012 in British cinema